Global, styled also as Global with Matthew Amroliwala (as of 8 September 2014), is a news programme on BBC World News that premiered on 14 January 2013 with the relaunch of the channel from Broadcasting House. The programme was hosted initially by Jon Sopel who joined the channel from the domestic BBC News channel. Sopel regularly presented the programme on location around the world and in this case it is broadcast in part on the BBC News channel. Sopel was promoted to North America Editor in 2014, and was succeeded in September by Matthew Amroliwala.

Global replaced The Hub, which originally was an edition of World News Today and served as a news 'nerve centre' for South Asia and the Middle East, providing both the headlines, and detailed analysis of the global news agenda.

Schedule 
Global is aired from 16:00–17:45pm and 18:00-18:15pm GMT (17:00–18:45pm and 19:00-19:15 pm BST in summer time), Monday to Thursday on BBC World News, split in-between by Sport Today and usually followed by an edition of Global Business.

Presenters 

When Jon Sopel presented, the title sequence ends by stating 'Global with Jon Sopel'. However, when he does not, as he is often on assignment, the titles only show 'Global', regardless of the replacement presenter. This only happens if he isn't reporting from a location on a topic covered in the show.

It was announced that Sopel will step down as presenter to become North America Editor; he presented his final episode on 17 July 2014.

Prior to Sopel's final episode, it was announced (on 8 July 2014) that BBC News Channel presenter Matthew Amroliwala will succeed Sopel in September 2014 as the main presenter. Amroliwala presented his first episode on 8 September 2014; and since the programme has been styled 'Global with Matthew Amroliwala'.

Dumor died on 18 January 2014 in his Hertfordshire, England home after a cardiac arrest, having been on air the day before. President of Ghana John Mahama said in a message on Twitter that Dumor was one of Ghana's "finest ambassadors" and "was a broadcaster of exceptional quality and Ghana's gift to the World."Mirchandani resigned from the BBC in October 2014; he has since become the Senior Director of Communications at the Center for Global Development.

Former presenters

References

External links
 (Current)
Global with Jon Sopel (2013-2014)

2013 British television series debuts
BBC World News shows